Allenville is a village in Moultrie County, Illinois, United States. The population was 132 at the 2020 census.

Geography

Demographics

As of the census of 2000, there were 154 people, 61 households, and 42 families residing in the village. The racial makeup of the village was 100.00% White.

There were 61 households, out of which 18.0% had children under the age of 18 living with them, 60.7% were married couples living together, 4.9% had a female householder with no husband present, and 31.1% were non-families. 26.2% of all households were made up of individuals, and 13.1% had someone living alone who was 65 years of age or older. The average household size was 2.52 and the average family size was 3.10.

In the village, the population was spread out, with 16.9% under the age of 18, 10.4% from 18 to 24, 20.8% from 25 to 44, 38.3% from 45 to 64, and 13.6% who were 65 years of age or older. The median age was 46 years. For every 100 females, there were 113.9 males. For every 100 females age 18 and over, there were 109.8 males.

The median income for a household in the village was $46,146, and the median income for a family was $48,750. Males had a median income of $31,250 versus $20,000 for females. The per capita income for the village was $16,586. About 4.0% of families and 7.7% of the population were below the poverty line, including none of those under the age of eighteen or sixty five or over.

References

Villages in Moultrie County, Illinois
Villages in Illinois